Byssomerulius corium is a common species of crust fungus in the family Irpicaceae. The fungus was first described as Thelephora corium by Christiaan Hendrik Persoon in 1801. Erast Parmasto made it the type species of his newly circumscribed genus Byssomerulius in 1967.

Distribution
Byssomerulius corium is a highly distributed fungus, and has been recorded in Africa, Asia, Australia, Europe, and in South, Central, and North America.

References

Fungi of Africa
Fungi of Asia
Fungi of Australia
Fungi of Central America
Fungi of Europe
Fungi of South America
Fungi of North America
Taxa named by Christiaan Hendrik Persoon
Irpicaceae
Fungi described in 1801